Winston Stanley (born 11 February 1989 in Brisbane, Australia) is an Australian-born Samoan former rugby union footballer who usually played as a centre and occasionally as a wing.

He moved back to his native Australia ahead of the 2012 Super Rugby season and signed for the Perth based Western Force. He made 11 appearances in his first season with the side and scored 2 tries.

Stanley was a member of the New Zealand Under 20 team that won the 2009 IRB Junior World Championship where he was later nominated for IRB junior player of the year losing out to Aaron Cruden.

Winston last played New Zealand club rugby for Dunedin Rugby Football Club.

Though born in Australia and represented the New Zealand Under-20s team, he represents Samoa at international level, making his debut against Italy on 8 November 2014 off the bench.

On 23 April 2015, Stanley moved to England to join Harlequins in the Aviva Premiership for the 2015–16 season.

On 20 March 2018, Stanley announced his immediate retirement from professional rugby due to injury.

Reference List

External links 
Winston Stanley itsrugby.co.uk Player Statistics

Living people
1989 births
Auckland rugby union players
Australian emigrants to New Zealand
Blues (Super Rugby) players
Highlanders (rugby union) players
Rugby union centres
Rugby union players from Brisbane
Samoa international rugby union players
Sportsmen from Queensland
Winston
Western Force players